Richard Attah (born 9 April 1995) is a Ghanaian professional footballer who plays as a goalkeeper for Ghanaian Premier league side Accra Hearts of Oak.

Career 
Richard Attah started his football career with Eastern Region-based division one club Okyeman Planners F.C. He later moved to Central Region base Elmina Sharks in 2017 and after spending 2 seasons with Elmina Sharks he then moved to Accra Hearts of Oak in 2019.

International career 
Attah was part of the Ghana National team in the 2021 Africa Cup of Nations that was eliminated at the group stage of the competition.

Honours 
Hearts of Oak

 Ghana Premier League: 2020–21
Ghanaian FA Cup: 2021

References

External links 
 

Living people
1995 births
Association football goalkeepers
Ghanaian footballers
Accra Hearts of Oak S.C. players
Ghana Premier League players
Elmina Sharks F.C. players